The Summer Biathlon World Championships are the world championships in summer biathlon which have been held annually since 1990.

Trail running (until 2009)

Men

Individual (6 km)

Sprint (4 km)

Pursuit (6 km)
This event was not held in 2007.

Mass start (6 km)
This event was first held in 1990. It was not held in 2006, and last held in 2007.

Relay (4 × 4 km)
This event was first held in 1997 and last held in 2005. From 1997 to 2002 the distance was 4 × 6 km.

Women

Individual (4 km)
This event was only held in 1996.

Sprint (3 km)
From 1996 to 2002 the distance was 4 km.

Pursuit (5 km)
From 1997 to 2002 the distance was 6 km. This event was not held in 2007.

Mass start (5 km)
This event was first held in 2003. It was not held in 2006, and last held in 2007.

Relay (4 × 3 km)
This event was first held in 1997 and last held in 2005. From 1997 to 2002 the distance was 4 × 4 km.

Mixed

Relay (2 × 3 km + 2 × 4 km)
This event was only held in 2006 and 2007.

Roller skiing (since 2006)

Men

Super-Sprint (5 km)

Sprint (7.5 km)

From 2006 to 2018 the distance was 10 km

Pursuit (10 km)

From 2006 to 2018 the distance was 12.5 km

Women

Super-Sprint (5 km)

Sprint (6 km)

From 2006 to 2018 the distance was 7.5 km

Pursuit (10 km)

From 2006 to 2018 the distance was 10 km

Mass Start (10 km)

Mixed

Relay (2 × 6 km + 2 × 7.5 km)

See also
 Biathlon World Championships

 
Summer biathlon competitions
Summer
Recurring sporting events established in 1996